Daniel Antonio Tordera Salvador (born 17 January 1986) is a Spanish chemist, material scientist and writer. He is currently an Assistant Professor in the Physical Chemistry Department at the University of Valencia.

Early life and education 
Tordera was born in Valencia, where he studied Chemistry at the University of Valencia. He graduated First of his promotion in 2009. He then moved to Strasbourg, where he earned his Material Science Engineers degree at the École européene de chimie, polymères et matériaux. He earned his PhD at the University of Valencia in 2014, working on light-emitting electrochemical cells. He worked as a postdoctoral researcher at the University of Linköping, studying photonics and plasmonic materials. He was then a researcher at Holst Centre (TNO) in Eindhoven working on organic photodetectors, position which he held until October 2020 when he accepted a position as Assistant Professor at the University of Valencia.

Research 
Tordera joined University of Valencia in 2009 where he worked in light-emitting electrochemical cells (LECs). He determined the elusive operational mechanism of LECs and dramatically increased the performance of these devices. He was a visiting scientist at University of California, Santa Barbara, where he applied his knowledge on conjugated polyelectrolytes. He then started a company with the aim of commercializing products based on his findings. He joined the University of Linköping to research the optical and thermal properties of plasmonic nanoholes. He worked on the development of a plasmonic thermoelectric device, a photoconductive paper and a plasmonic display, among others. He then joined Holst Centre leading a team working on near-infrarred organic photodetectors. There he created the first large-area thin-film vein detector  and contributed to the progress of photodetectors in the fields of biometrics and healthcare. He has published over 50 publications in peer-reviewed scientific journals and is the inventor of 4 patents.

Awards 
2020 - Society of Information Display Distinguished Paper.

2015 - Nanomatmol Award: Best PH.D. in Nanotechnology and Molecular Materials in Spain by the Spanish Royal Society of Chemistry.

2015 - Outstanding Doctorate Award by the Universidad de Valencia.

2012 - European Materials Research Society Spring Meeting Young Scientist Award.

2010 - Award “Suschem Young Chemistry Researchers” to the Highest Academic Achievement in Spain by the Spanish Royal Society of Chemistry

Personal life 
Daniel Tordera considers himself a politically active person. He has developed a satirical political video game Pedro Sanchez Simulator that was played by more than 50,000 people in less than a month and gained lot of media attention. He enjoys writing, photography and making music.

He received the honor of being one of the 10 finalists to the 2018 Planeta awards for his novel "El Arte de la Fuga"

References

External links 
Google Scholar.

1986 births
Living people
Materials scientists and engineers
University of Valencia alumni
Spanish chemists
People from Valencia